Zaur Magomedalievich Abdullaev (born 23 March 1994) is a Russian professional boxer who challenged for the WBC interim lightweight title in 2019.

Professional career
Abdullaev made his professional debut on 4 March 2017, scoring a first-round technical knockout (TKO) victory over Sardorbek Kamilov at the Sports Complex Leader in Berezovsky, Russia.

After compiling a record of 7–0 (5 KOs) he defeated Ardie Boyose on 10 February 2018 at the DIVS, Yekaterinburg, Russia, capturing the WBO Youth lightweight title via seventh-round TKO. At the time of the stoppage all three judges had Abdullaev winning with scores of 60–54, 59–55 and 59–55.

In his next fight he defeated Deiner Berrio via unanimous decision (UD) on 22 April at DIVS to capture the vacant WBC Silver lightweight title. Two judges scored the bout 117–111 and the third scored it 115–113.

He retained the title by UD against Hank Lundy in September, followed by a TKO win in a non-title fight against Humberto Martínez in February 2019 before facing Devin Haney for the vacant WBC interim lightweight title. The bout took place on 13 September 2019 at the Hulu Theater in New York City. Abdullaev suffered the first defeat of his career, losing by fourth-round corner retirement (RTD) after Abdullaev's corner pulled him out of the bout before the start of the fifth round.

Following his failed title bid, Abdullaev faced Pavel Malikov on 22 August 2020. He won the fight by a seventh-round knockout, after knocking Malikov down once in the fifth round and twice in rounds four and six. Abdullaev faced the journeyman Zhora Hamazaryan on 27 March 2021, and won the fight by unanimous decision, with scores of 94–93, 96–91 and 95–92.

After successfully bouncing back from his first professional loss, Abdullaev was booked to face Dejan Zlatičanin for the vacant WBC Silver lightweight title on 11 September 2021. He won the fight by unanimous decision, with scores of 118–110, 119–109 and 117–111. Abdullaev is scheduled to face the former three-weight world champion Jorge Linares in his first title defense on 19 February 2022. He won the fight by a twelfth-round technical knockout. Adbullaev knocked Linares down twice in the last round of the bout, before forcing a referee stoppage with a flurry of punches at the 2:28 minute mark.

Professional boxing record

References

Living people
1994 births
Russian male boxers
Sportspeople from Stavropol Krai
Lightweight boxers